Bruce Lai, real name Chang Yi-tao (1950 – 2014), was a Hong Kong actor who starred in many Godfrey Ho films.

He died in 2014.

Filmography

Snow Plum Blossom (1976)
Stranger from Shaolin (1976)
Bruce Lee's Ways of Kung Fu (1977)
Mantis Combat (1978)
The Divine Martial Arts of Dharma (1978)
Enter Three Dragons (1978)
Blooded Treasure Fight (1979)
Golden Dragon, Silver Snake (1980)
The Great Conspiracy (1980)
The Young Master (1980)
Return to the 36th Chamber (1980)
The Clones of Bruce Lee (1980)
The Heroic One (1981)
The Dragon's Snake Fist (1981)
The Kung Fu Emperor (1981)
Hero at the Border Region (1981)
Fury in Shaolin Temple (1981)
Postman Strikes Back (1982)
Challenge of the Lady Ninja (1983)
Shaolin Vs. Lama (1983)
The Super Ninja (1984)
Crocodile Hero (1985)
Chinese Evil Technique (1986)
The Young Taoism Fighter (1986)
Woman in the Forest Story (1987)
The Falcon (1989)
The Other Kind of Penalty (1989)
Fighter of Death (1989)
Braveful Police (1990)

See also
 Bruceploitation

References

External links

 HK Cinemagic entry

Deaths from cancer
Hong Kong male actors
1950 births
2014 deaths
Bruce Lee imitators